State Road 538 (NM 538) is a  state highway in the US state of New Mexico. NM 538's southern terminus is at U.S. Route 87 (US 87) in Clayton, and the northern terminus is at US 56/US 64/US 412 in Clayton.

Major intersections

See also

References

538
Transportation in Union County, New Mexico